The TecDAX stock index tracks the performance of the 30 largest German companies from the technology sector. In terms of order book turnover and market capitalization the companies rank below those included in the DAX.

The TecDax was introduced on 24 March 2003. It succeeded the NEMAX50 (Neuer Markt — new market) stock index of German new economy companies that existed from 1997 to 2003 and was discontinued after extreme value loss due to the burst of the dot-com bubble.

TecDAX is based on prices generated in Xetra. The index is calculated on every trading day, between 9am and 5.30pm CET .

In 2018, the TecDAX had an average performance of 23,3 % in five years, outpacing even the NASDAQ.

Companies 
The following 30 companies make up the index as of the quarterly review effective February 2021.

1&1 Drillisch
Aixtron
Bechtle
Cancom AG
Carl Zeiss Meditec
CompuGroup Medical SE
Deutsche Telekom
Dräger (company)
Eckert & Ziegler Strahlen- und Medizintechnik AG
Evotec
Freenet
Infineon Technologies
Jenoptik
LPKF Laser & Electronics AG
MorphoSys
Nagarro SE
Nemetschek
Nordex
Pfeiffer Vacuum
Qiagen

SAP
Sartorius
Siemens Healthineers
Siltronic
Software AG
TeamViewer AG
Telefónica Germany
United Internet
VARTA
XING

See also 
 DAX
 MDAX
 SDAX
 ÖkoDAX

References

External links 
 TecDAX official information from Deutsche Börse

German stock market indices
Stock market indices by industry